is a Japanese footballer currently playing as a midfielder for Azul Claro Numazu of J3 League.

Career statistics

Club
.

Notes

References

External links

2001 births
Living people
Japanese footballers
Association football midfielders
J3 League players
Azul Claro Numazu players